Kuala Lumpur is reputable for its vibrant shopping scene. Tourism is a big industry in Malaysia, raking in billions in tourist revenue annually, hence many malls have sprouted over the years. There are also a number of markets in Petaling Street, Kuala Lumpur's historic Chinatown that draw both locals and international tourists.

Highlights

Central Market

Central Market is a shopping area dedicated to local arts and crafts. It sells a multitude of colourful batiks, the traditional dressing of ethnic Malay Malaysians and other souvenirs. Besides that, Central Market also sells sarees and cheongsams among other cultural legacies of Malaysia's diverse ethnic minorities. One can also find religious-motivated arts and other trinkets inspired by Buddhism and Hinduism. Traditional Malay craft in the form of local daggers (keris), beautifully embellished woodcarvings, traditional kites, songkets among other items. There are plans to evolve this place into an art colony.

Night markets

Petaling Street

Petaling Street (Simplified Chinese: 茨厂街) The name is called 'Chee Cheong Kai' (Cantonese) which means starch factory street is reminiscent of the days where tapioca would be grounded here. This is the Chinatown of Malaysia, there are plenty of counterfeit luxury goods, clothes and shoes sold here. Asian fashion are sold here at cheap prices. Traditional Chinese medicines and China-imported books are aplenty in the Chinese bookstores the surrounding Petaling Street. There are plenty of delicious Chinese food and delicacies and local fruits sold here. Haggling is necessary to obtain the best bargains. It is opened into the wee hours of the morning.

Lorong Tuanku Abdul Rahman

It is only opened once a week on Saturdays from 5 – 10 pm—an exciting place to trawl for casual attire, local products, and local delicacies. The fashion featured here is more conservative as the products are targeted at the local Muslim Malay population. Nonetheless, this is the ideal place to buy silks and other quality materials. Many Malay fashion houses are located here. Prices here are cheap if one knows how to bargain. Colourful baju kurung and baju kebaya- the traditional clothing of ethnic Malays- can be found here. The headscarf are also sold here. Luxury fakes, T-shirts, jeans, crafts made of ceramics and pewter are ubiquitous at designated sections of this night market. There are a couple of shopping complexes located nearby.

Brickfields

This is the Little India of Malaysia. Traditionally the focal point of the Indian colony of Kuala Lumpur, there are plenty to see and buy here.

Bukit Bintang

Bukit Bintang is the main designated retail artery of Kuala Lumpur. It has the highest concentration of malls in Kuala Lumpur. Besides modern upmarket retailers, this area also features night markets retailing arts and crafts, counterfeit goods among other souvenirs.

List of notable shopping malls
Malls that are categorised into classes are highlights more mainstream and patronised.

City Centre
Pavilion Kuala Lumpur (upper)
Suria KLCC (high-end)
Starhill Gallery (high-end)
Fahrenheit 88 (middle)
LaLaport Bukit Bintang City Centre (middle)
Lot 10 (middle)
Low Yat Plaza (middle)
KL SOGO (middle)
Maju Junction (middle)
Avenue K (middle)
Intermark Mall (middle)
Berjaya Times Square (bargain)
Sungei Wang Plaza (bargain)
South City Plaza (bargain)
Sunway Putra Mall
Great Eastern Mall
The Weld
Ampang Park
Kota Raya Complex
Setapak Central (formerly KL Festival City)
Quill City Mall
The Exchange TRX (opening soon)
118 Mall (opening soon)

Greater Kuala Lumpur

Mid Valley City

The Garden (upper) and Mid Valley Megamall (middle) are located in bustling Greater KL, along the fringes of the city proper. They are both connected by sky bridges, each catering to different segments of shoppers. The Gardens is an upscale mall hosting designer labels the likes of Louis Vuitton, Marks and Spencer, Nine West, ALDO, Geox, ECCO, Lancel, Burberry, DKNY, GAP, ESPRIT, Armani Exchange, Hush Puppies and Hugo Boss, it is anchored by Singapore-based Robinsons and Japanese retailer Isetan while Mid Valley Megamall caters to the mainly middle-class segment with high-street labels coexisting side-by-side with local retailers. The malls are well-patronised by locals. There are flea markets on weekends in Mid Valley Megamall, where arts and crafts, food, trinkets and souvenirs are sold.

Sunway Pyramid

Sunway Pyramid (middle) is a huge Egyptian-themed retail mall nestled in a mixed integrated resort that features a wet/dry Wild West-inspired theme park. The retail podium can be reached through the Federal Highway and is located in Bandar Sunway. The mall has distinct Egyptian aesthetics, including pyramids, sphinx, its walls in-scripted with hieroglyphics. The clothes sold here are more towards the young and trendy. The mall is zoned into various themed sections, including Asian Avenue and Marrakesh. The brands sold here are a mix of high street brands like Dorothy Perkins, Marks and Spencer, GUESS, [Springfield, Timberland, ZARA, PUMA, Lacoste, MANGO and Coach with lesser-known local and regional brands. Malaysia's first ice-skating rink is located here.

Bangsar Village

Bangsar Village (middle-upper) is located in Bangsar and positioned as a small upmarket neighbourhood mall catering to the large expatriate population of Kuala Lumpur. Prices here are a notch higher by local standards.

Empire Gallery Subang
Empire Gallery Subang (middle-upper) is an upmarket neighbourhood mall located in the outskirts of KL, in Subang Jaya. It can be reached by the Federal Highway from Kuala Lumpur. It is small in size and features several international brands alongside exclusive local batik and clothings. It is anchored by a relatively small Tangs departmental store.

1 Utama

1 Utama is a (middle-upper) mall borders Kuala Lumpur in Petaling Jaya. It is defined as a large-scale neighbourhood mall largely occupied with locally grown and regional retail startups and establishments. This behemoth however also features American staples the likes of DKNY, Lacoste, florsheim, Massimo Dutti, Forever 21, Coach, Brooks Brothers, GAP, Uniqlo, Cotton On, Polo Ralph Lauren and Tommy Hilfiger.

KL Eco City Mall

Sunway Velocity

IOI City Mall

See also 

 List of shopping malls in Malaysia
 Lists of shopping malls
 Shopping mall

References

External links 

 Official site of Pavilion KL
Official website of KL Eco City Mall
 KL shopping guide
 Malaysia One-stop Shopping Mall Directory
 KL shopping guide

Shopping
Economy of Kuala Lumpur
Retailing in Kuala Lumpur